Sibbaldianthe is a genus of flowering plants belonging to the family Rosaceae. It is also in the Rosoideae subfamily.

Its native range is from south eastern and eastern Europe (within East European Russia, Central European Russia, Crimea, Romania, South European Russia and Ukraine), to temperate Asia including Siberia (Altay, Buryatiya, Chita, Irkutsk, Krasnoyarsk, Tuva and West Siberia,), Russian Far East (Amur, Kamchatka, Khabarovsk, Magadan, Primorye and Sakhalin), central Asia (within Kazakhstan, Kyrgyzstan, Tajikistan, Turkmenistan and Uzbekistan), the Caucasus (North Caucasus and Transcaucasus,) Western Asia (Afghanistan, Iran and Turkey), China (within Inner Mongolia, Manchuria, Qinghai, Tibet and Xinjiang,) Mongolia, Korea, tropical Asia (within East Himalaya, Nepal, Pakistan and West Himalaya). 

The genus name of Sibbaldianthe is in honour of Robert Sibbald (1641–1722), a Scottish physician and antiquary. 
It was first described and published in V.L.Komarov (ed.), Fl. URSS Vol.10 on page 615 in 1941.

known species
According to Kew:
Sibbaldianthe adpressa 
Sibbaldianthe bifurca 
Sibbaldianthe imbricata 
Sibbaldianthe moorcroftii 
Sibbaldianthe orientalis 
Sibbaldianthe semiglabra 
Sibbaldianthe sericea

References

Rosaceae
Rosaceae genera
Plants described in 1845
Flora of Romania
Flora of Eastern Europe
Flora of Siberia
Flora of the Russian Far East
Flora of Central Asia
Flora of the Caucasus
Flora of Afghanistan
Flora of Iran
Flora of China
Flora of Mongolia
Flora of Korea
Flora of East Himalaya
Flora of West Himalaya
Flora of Nepal
Flora of Pakistan